This is a list of hospitals in the U.S. state of Maryland, sorted by location.

Annapolis (Anne Arundel County)
Anne Arundel Medical Center

Baltimore
Baltimore VA Medical Center
Grace Medical Center
Johns Hopkins Hospital
Johns Hopkins Bayview Medical Center
Kennedy Krieger Institute
Levindale Hebrew Geriatric Center and Hospital
MedStar Good Samaritan Hospital
MedStar Harbor Hospital
MedStar Union Memorial Hospital
Mercy Medical Center
Mt. Washington Pediatric Hospital
R Adams Cowley Shock Trauma Center
St. Agnes Hospital
Sinai Hospital of Baltimore
University of Maryland Medical Center
University of Maryland Medical Center Midtown Campus
University of Maryland Rehabilitation & Orthopaedic Institute

Bel Air (Harford County)
University of Maryland Upper Chesapeake Medical Center

Berlin (Worcester County)
Atlantic General Hospital

Bethesda (Montgomery County)
Suburban Hospital
Walter Reed National Military Medical Center (formerly National Naval Medical Center)
Warren Grant Magnuson Clinical Center, NIH

Cambridge (Dorchester County)
Eastern Shore Hospital Center
University of Maryland Shore Medical Center at Cambridge (Freestanding Emergency Center/Medical Pavilion)

Catonsville (Baltimore County)
Spring Grove Hospital Center

Chestertown (Kent County)
University of Maryland Shore Medical Center at Chestertown

Cheverly (Prince George's County)
University of Maryland Prince George's Hospital Center
Gladys Spellman Specialty Hospital & Nursing Center

Clinton (Prince George's County)
MedStar Southern Maryland Hospital Center

Columbia (Howard County)
Howard County General Hospital

Cumberland (Allegany County)
Brandenburg Center
Thomas B. Finan Center
UPMC Western Maryland

Easton (Talbot County)
University of Maryland Shore Medical Center at Easton

Ellicott City (Howard County)
Sheppard Pratt at Ellicott City

Elkton (Cecil County)
Union Hospital

Fort Washington (Prince George's County)
Adventist HealthCare Fort Washington Medical Center

Frederick (Frederick County)
Frederick Memorial Hospital

Germantown (Montgomery County)
Holy Cross Germantown Hospital

Glen Burnie (Anne Arundel County)
University of Maryland Baltimore Washington Medical Center

Hagerstown (Washington County)
Brook Lane Psychiatric Center
Meritus Medical Center
Western Maryland Hospital Center

Havre de Grace (Harford County)
University of Maryland Harford Memorial Hospital

Lanham (Prince George's County)
Doctors Community Hospital

La Plata (Charles County)
University of Maryland Charles Regional Medical Center

Laurel (Prince George's County)
University of Maryland Laurel Medical Center

Leonardtown (St. Mary's County)
MedStar St. Mary's Hospital

Oakland (Garrett County)
Garrett Regional Medical Center

Olney (Montgomery County)
MedStar Montgomery Medical Center

Prince Frederick (Calvert County)
CalvertHealth Medical Center

Randallstown (Baltimore County)
Northwest Hospital

Rockville (Montgomery County)
Adventist HealthCare Rehabilitation
Adventist HealthCare Shady Grove Medical Center

Rossville (Baltimore County)
MedStar Franklin Square Hospital Center

Salisbury (Wicomico County)
Deer's Head Center
HealthSouth Chesapeake Rehabilitation Hospital
Holly Center
TidalHealth Peninsula Regional

Silver Spring (Montgomery County)
 Adventist HealthCare White Oak Medical Center
Holy Cross Hospital
Saint Luke Institute

Sykesville (Carroll County)
Springfield Hospital Center

Towson (Baltimore County)
Greater Baltimore Medical Center
University of Maryland St. Joseph Medical Center
The Sheppard & Enoch Pratt Hospital

Westminster (Carroll County)
Carroll Hospital

Defunct
Children's Hospital
 Church Home and Hospital
Crownsville Hospital Center
Fallston General Hospital
Edward W. McCready Memorial Hospital
Forest Haven
Fort Howard Veterans Hospital
Glenn Dale Hospital
Henryton State Hospital
Jarvis Hospital
Liberty Medical Center
Lutheran Hospital
Memorial of Cumberland
Pine Bluff State Hospital
Rosewood Center
Sacred Heart
University of Maryland Shore Medical Center at Dorchester
University Specialty Hospital
Walter P Carter Center
Washington County Hospital
Women's Hospital

References

Maryland

Hospitals